Van Halen III is the eleventh studio album by American rock band Van Halen, released on March 17, 1998, by Warner Bros. Records. Produced by Mike Post and Eddie Van Halen, it was the band's first studio album in three years after Balance (1995),  the band's only studio album to feature Extreme lead vocalist Gary Cherone, and the last to feature bassist Michael Anthony, who only appears on three of the album's songs while the rest of the bass parts are played by Eddie Van Halen; his son Wolfgang replaced Anthony on subsequent tours and recordings. Eddie Van Halen's extensive involvement in the album's production, instrumentation and writing have led some, including Anthony, to consider Van Halen III more of a solo project than a collective band effort. Clocking in at over 65 minutes, Van Halen III is their longest album.

The album reached No. 4 in the United States and achieved Gold status, but was a relative commercial disappointment for the band, whose previous four albums had all been chart-topping, multi-platinum sellers; though the lead single "Without You" performed well on radio. Critical and fan reaction was also largely negative, with criticism directed at its songwriting, production, band performances and length. The lukewarm reception prematurely halted work on a follow-up album with Cherone, who departed soon after. Van Halen III was the band's last studio album for fourteen years until their 2012 comeback A Different Kind of Truth.

Production
The album's title refers to Van Halen's third recorded line-up, and to the band's first two album titles, Van Halen and Van Halen II. None of its material is featured on The Best of Both Worlds, the band's 2004 compilation.

As a producer, Eddie brought his friend Mike Post. The album's final track, "How Many Say I", was an unusual acoustic piano ballad featuring Eddie on lead vocals, and Cherone on backing vocals: Eddie declared he was forced into singing, and added harmonies so he would not perform alone.

Van Halen III is also known for its minimal use of Michael Anthony on bass guitar. Anthony only played bass on "Without You", "One I Want" & "Fire in the Hole"; Eddie Van Halen recorded bass for the rest of the album tracks that feature bass. After Michael Anthony's departure from Van Halen, he confirmed that Eddie Van Halen dictated to him how to play bass on this record. 

Anthony also said by the time of making this album, Eddie was playing the bass more as well as drums.  "I don't know if Eddie was basically making a solo record, which is what Van Halen III seemed like to me." A track entitled "That's Why I Love You" was dropped at the last minute in favor of "Josephina", with "Fire in the Hole" featuring on the Lethal Weapon 4 film soundtrack.

"I would have preferred to tour with them and then put out a record," Cherone told KNAC. "It would have been a better idea to establish myself first and then hit the studio with the band… There were some great ideas and some little gems but it was not a great record. I had fun but at times it was like being a stranger in a strange land."

The album cover is a still picture from stock footage of Frank "Cannonball" Richards, a vaudeville and sideshow performer known for his act of getting shot in the gut with a cannonball.

Commercial performance
Van Halen III debuted on the Billboard 200 at number 4, with 191,000 copies sold. The album's only significant radio hit was "Without You", which reached No. 1 on the Mainstream Rock Tracks chart on the March 7, 1998, issue of Billboard, and remained there for six weeks. Other songs receiving airplay on rock radio were "Fire in the Hole" and "One I Want".

Critical reception

Reception for Van Halen III was mostly mixed to negative. Stephen Thomas Erlewine from AllMusic stated the album, "suffers from the same problems as Hagar-era Van Halen – limp riffs, weak melodies, and plodding, colorless rhythms." Entertainment Weekly gave it a B grade rating, saying, "judging from the renewed intensity of Eddie’s guitar playing throughout much of III, having a merely competent, relatively ego-free singer seems to have reinvigorated his muse" but goes on to say "How Many Say I", a song Eddie sang lead vocals on was, "cringeworthy" and "unintentionally hilarious". Greg Kot from Rolling Stone gave it 2 stars out of 5 noting, "Cherone sounds disconcertingly like Hagar, full of spleen-busting bluster and incapable of understatement", and "When the band plays it heavy, it mires itself in a Seventies tar pit, with only the chorus of "Without You" achieving any sort of pop resonance." Kot compliments Eddie's vocals saying, "'How Many Say I' finds the guitarist singing in a disarmingly appealing, nicotine-stained voice over a moody piano melody." Billboard reviewer Paul Verna summed up III as "a wasted opportunity to breathe life into a now-tired formula".

Track listing
All songs credited to Eddie Van Halen, Michael Anthony, Gary Cherone and Alex Van Halen.

Personnel

Van Halen
Gary Cherone – lead vocals, backing vocals (track 12)
Eddie Van Halen – guitars, bass (tracks 4–6, 8, 9 and 11), keyboards, drums, electric sitar (tracks 1 and 10), backing vocals, lead vocals (track 12), production, engineering
Michael Anthony – bass (tracks 2, 3 and 7), backing vocals
Alex Van Halen – drums, percussion

Additional personnel
Mike Post – piano on "Neworld", production

Production
Florian Ammon – programming
Dan Chavkin – photography
Ian Dye – programming
The Edward – mixing, mastering
Erwin Musper – engineers
Robbes – mixing, mastering
Ed Rogers – programming
F. Scott Schafer – coloring
Eddy Schreyer – mastering
Stine Schyberg – art direction
Paul Wight – programming

Charts

Weekly charts

Year-end charts

Singles

Certifications

References

1998 albums
Van Halen albums
Warner Records albums
Albums produced by Mike Post